Cleveland and Whitby was a parliamentary constituency centred on the town of Whitby in northern England.  It returned one Member of Parliament (MP)  to the House of Commons of the Parliament of the United Kingdom from February 1974 until it was abolished for the 1983 general election.

Cleveland and Whitby largely replaced the previous Cleveland constituency.  It was defined as covering the urban districts of Guisborough, Loftus, Saltburn and Marske by the Sea, Skelton and Brotton, Whitby, along with Whitby Rural District.

Members of Parliament

Election results

Notes and references 

Parliamentary constituencies in Yorkshire and the Humber (historic)
Parliamentary constituencies in North East England (historic)
Constituencies of the Parliament of the United Kingdom established in 1974
Constituencies of the Parliament of the United Kingdom disestablished in 1983
Whitby